Li Jing, also known as Pagoda-Bearing Heavenly King Li is a figure in Chinese mythology and a god in Chinese folk religion. He carries a tower that can capture any spirit, demon or god within its walls. He also appears in the classic Chinese novels Journey to the West and Fengshen Yanyi (Investiture of the Gods). He is an analogue of Vaisravana.

Mythology
Li Jing is renowned throughout the Shang Dynasty as a high ranking commander officer of the Old Pond Pass. His wife is Lady Yin, and he has three sons, Jinzha, Muzha, and Nezha. Throughout his past, Li Jing had studied under Superiorman Danger Skipper of Mount Kunlun, and had soon become a master of exceedingly fast underground travel (even to the extent of traveling thousands of kilometres  without a single individual noticing). 

In time, Li Jing would have a third son by the name of Nezha, as destined by the heavens. He and Nezha's relationship began as rocky because Nezha is disobedient and short-tempered. Nezha would cause untold chaos and trouble in the future, such as that with the Eastern Sea Dragon King Ao Guang. Nezha kills the Dragon King's son and gains his wrath. Due to Nezha causing trouble in the Eastern Sea Dragon's Kingdom, Li Jing was required to give his life to Ao Guang if he did not sacrifice Nezha. But Nezha sacrificed himself, handing over his flesh to his parents.

Following the bitter luck attained with his third son, Li Jing burned the sacrificial temple that had been built for Nezha's spirit. However, this made Nezha wish to kill his father. After Nezha was reincarnated, his body remade by his master Taiyi Zhenren, his father saw him and said, "You vermin! When you were my child, you caused untold calamities. Why do you reincarnate and disturb the peace?" Thus, a major conflict between Li Jing and Nezha began to unfold.

After battling  Nezha, Li Jing soon realized that his mortal body did not match 1 to 100 compared to that of Nezha's. Thus, he ran as fast as he could underground in a state of incredible fear for his life. Luckily, Li Jing happened to run into his second son, Muzha. Following Muzha's defeat by Nezha's hands, Li Jing tried to commit suicide. Wenshu Guangfa Tianzun interceded, saving Li Jing's life and containing Nezha. Nezha was then forced to submit to his father after being restrained by another superiorman by the name of Randeng Daoren. To effectively restrain his son, Randeng Daoren would teach Li Jing how to use the golden tower art as to trap Nezha within a burning tower if opposed. Thus, Nezha would be forced to submit to Li Jing, now better known as Li the Pagoda Bearer.

References
 Fengshen Bang, chapters 12–14.

Investiture of the Gods characters
Chinese gods
Deities in Taoism
Journey to the West characters